Audrey Jean-Baptiste (born 15 July 1991) is a Canadian sprinter specialising in the 400 metres. She competed at the 2015 World Championships in Beijing finishing 39th overall in the heats.

International competitions

References

External links
 
 

1991 births
Living people
Athletes from Montreal
Canadian female sprinters
World Athletics Championships athletes for Canada
Athletes (track and field) at the 2015 Pan American Games
Athletes (track and field) at the 2014 Commonwealth Games
Commonwealth Games competitors for Canada
Black Canadian track and field athletes
Black Canadian sportswomen
Pan American Games medalists in athletics (track and field)
Pan American Games bronze medalists for Canada
Medalists at the 2015 Pan American Games
Tulsa Golden Hurricane women's track and field athletes